The John Byrd EP by the band Death Cab for Cutie was recorded live during their spring 2004 North American tour. It is named after the sound engineer that worked with them during the tour. The album was the band's last release on the indie label Barsuk Records. It was only available in a limited number of record stores and through the record label's website.

Track listing

All songs written by Ben Gibbard except where noted.

Death Cab for Cutie albums
2005 EPs